Senator Hoffman may refer to:

D. B. Hoffman (fl. 1860s), California State Senate
Gretchen Hoffman (born 1957), Minnesota State Senate
John Hoffman (Minnesota politician) (born 1965), Minnesota State Senate
Lyman Hoffman (born 1950), Alaska State Senate

See also
Nancy Larraine Hoffmann (born 1947), New York State Senate